Gaspar Zarrías Arevalo (born 30 April 1955 Madrid, Spain) is a Spanish lawyer, politician and member of the Spanish Socialist Workers' Party (PSOE), which he joined in 1972.

Zarrias served as the interim President of the Regional Government of Andalusia from 7 April 2009, to 23 April 2009. He has served as the President's Office Minister for the Parliament of Andalusia and a member of the Organizing Committee of the Mediterranean Games of Almeria (COJMA). He has served as the Secretario de Ciudades y Política Municipal del PSOE, a leading position within the PSOE, since February 2012.

He previously served as a Councillor of Cazalilla (Jaén). He is involved in ERE corruption scandal since 2016.

References

External links
PSOE's Official Website

1955 births
Living people
Presidents of the Regional Government of Andalusia
Spanish Socialist Workers' Party politicians
Government ministers of Spain
Members of the 1st Parliament of Andalusia
Members of the 2nd Parliament of Andalusia
Members of the 3rd Parliament of Andalusia
Members of the 4th Parliament of Andalusia
Members of the 5th Parliament of Andalusia
Members of the 6th Parliament of Andalusia
Members of the 7th Parliament of Andalusia
Members of the 8th Parliament of Andalusia
Secretaries of State of Spain